The Innovators: How a Group of Hackers, Geniuses, and Geeks Created the Digital Revolution is an overview of the history of computer science and the Digital Revolution. It was written by Walter Isaacson, and published in 2014 by Simon & Schuster.

The book summarizes the contributions of several innovators who have made pivotal breakthroughs in computer technology and its applications—from the world's first computer programmer, Ada Lovelace, and Alan Turing's work in artificial intelligence, through the Information Age of the present.

Corrections
In December 2015, Simon & Schuster published a revised electronic edition of The Innovators, which corrected significant errors and omissions in the original edition's Chapter 9, which covers Software. Isaacson – who in researching the book interviewed Bill Gates but not Paul Allen – had assigned virtually all credit for the company's early innovations and success to Gates, when in fact they were the product of highly collaborative efforts by several people, including Allen. In the revised edition, among other edits, Isaacson includes archival material from 1981 in which Gates credits Allen for being the “idea man” in charge of R&D at Microsoft, while he, Gates, was “the frontman running the business.”

In the 2019 three-part Netflix docuseries, Inside Bill's Brain: Decoding Bill Gates, this conflict is briefly mentioned by who appears to be Gates's secretary as she goes over the books that Gates was reading at the time of recording.

Isaacson explains in his book that, as he was writing about Wikipedia and how it worked, he decided that his book should be collectively examined in a Wikipedia manner. A draft was hence uploaded on Medium, allowing thousands of readers to make dozens of comments to correct and improve the book.

Innovators by chapter
Innovators discussed in the book by chapter:

 Chapter 1 – Ada, Countess of Lovelace:
 Charles Babbage, Ada Lovelace
 Chapter 2 – The Computer:
 Herman Hollerith, Vannevar Bush, Konrad Zuse, Alan Turing, George Stibitz, Claude Shannon, Howard Aiken, John Atanasoff, John Mauchly, J. Presper Eckert
 Chapter 3 – Programming:
Grace Hopper, Richard Bloch, Jean Jennings, John von Neumann
 Chapter 4 – The Transistor:
John Bardeen, William Shockley, Walter Brattain, Patrick Haggerty, Robert Noyce, Gordon Moore
 Chapter 5 – The Microchip:
Jack Kilby, Arthur Rock, Andy Grove, Ted Hoff, Jean Hoerni
 Chapter 6 – Video Games:
Steve Russell, Nolan Bushnell
 Chapter 7 – The Internet:
J. C. R. Licklider, Robert Taylor, Larry Roberts, Paul Baran, Donald Davies, Leonard Kleinrock, Vint Cerf, Bob Kahn
Chapter 8 –  The Personal Computer:
Ken Kesey, Stewart Brand, Doug Engelbart, Alan Kay, Lee Felsenstien, Ed Roberts
Chapter 9 – Software:
Paul Allen, Bill Gates, Steve Wozniak, Steve Jobs, Richard Stallman, Linus Torvalds, Dan Bricklin
Chapter 10 – Online
William von Meister, Steve Case, Al Gore
Chapter 11 – The Web
Tim Berners-Lee, Marc Andreessen Justin Hall, Ev Williams, Ward Cunningham, Jimmy Wales, Larry Page, Sergey Brin
Chapter 12 – Ada Forever

See also

2014 in literature

References

External links 
 Simon & Schuster Publisher's article on The Innovators
Discussion with Isaacson on The Innovators at the Computer History Museum in Mountain View, California, October 14, 2014
Discussion with Isaacson The Innovators at the Miami Book Fair International, November 22, 2014
 You can look it up: The Wikipedia story – excerpt from The Innovators

2014 non-fiction books
American history books
Biographies about businesspeople
Biographies and autobiographies of mathematicians
Books about Apple Inc.
Books about computer and internet companies
Books about computer and internet entrepreneurs
Books about computer hacking
Books about the Digital Revolution
Books about economic history
Books about Google
Books about the Internet
Books about scientists
Books about Wikipedia
Cultural depictions of Alan Turing
Hacker culture
Popular science books
Simon & Schuster books
Intel
Works about Microsoft